Brushy Creek State Recreation Area is a state park in Webster County, Iowa in the United States.

A relatively new recreational area, Brushy Creek did not have an easy beginning. In 1967, the Iowa Department of Natural Resources published a controversial proposal to flood Brushy Creek's forested canyon. The proposal was met with enough public opposition that the idea was debated for the next twenty years.

Nearby towns

Picnicking and shelters
Brushy Creek offers picnic areas around the park, with tables and fire grills. Two open shelters can be reserved online through the park reservation system.

Equestrian camping
Equestrian users can choose one of two modern camp facilities. The northern equestrian campground has a modern shower and restroom, 125 campsites (50 electrical), horse wash area, ample shade, a substantial hitch rail at every site (users are required to tie animals to rails) and a 100' by 200' arena. Water hydrants with potable water are available, as are picnic tables, grills, and a playground. In the future another shower/toilet building will be constructed.

The south campground has a modern shower and restroom with 62 electric, 22 non-electric sites, and 8 full water and sewer hookup sites with the same amenities as the northern campground. Advance campsite reservations can be reserved online through the park reservation system. Half of the campsites are still available on a first-come, first-served basis.

Non-equestrian camping
The non-equestrian campground has 47 sites including 39 electric sites, and 8 with full water and sewer hookups. This location makes the campground convenient for those using the nearby boat ramp and beach, and is also available for picnicking. Half of these campsites can be reserved online through the park reservation system, and the rest are available on a first-come, first-served basis.

Equestrian day use staging area
There is a day-use staging area near both equestrian campgrounds that users are free to use at no charge for the day. Facilities include seasonal restrooms. Additional staging areas are being developed in the southern area.

Lake activities
Fishing is a popular activity at Brushy Creek. The creek and Des Moines River provide a challenge to the angler with smallmouth bass and panfish as favorite catches. Several boat ramps and fishing jetties are located around the  lake. A fishing pier is located on the west side of the lake, north of the beach area. There are fishing tournaments occurring almost every weekend out on the lake.

Swimming is allowed in the designated beach area only. A large sandy beach is located on the west side of the lake.

Trails
Mountain biking is allowed on all multiple use trails. A map of these trails is on display at the information kiosks located in the equestrian campgrounds.

Hunting
Hunting is also a popular activity at Brushy Creek. Hunters can pursue a variety of game species ranging from pheasants, quail, rabbits and squirrels to white-tailed deer and wild turkeys. A number of designated parking areas are located throughout Brushy Creek to provide convenient access for the hunter.

Shooting range
Two ranges are located at the Brushy Creek State Recreational Area. One is south of the park office approximately 1/2 mile north of County Rd. D-46. The other is a trap range located in the northern section of the park.

External links
 Brushy Creek State Recreational Area

State parks of Iowa
Protected areas of Webster County, Iowa
Landforms of Webster County, Iowa
Lakes of Iowa